Vasim Aon Jafarey (died 2011), was a Pakistani civil servant who served as the ninth Governor of the State Bank of Pakistan.

He was a graduate of Allahabad University.

References

Governors of the State Bank of Pakistan
University of Allahabad alumni
Year of birth missing
2011 deaths